Isabell Klein (born 28 June 1984) Isabell Nagel, is a German handball player for Nantes Handball.

She participated in the 2011 World Women's Handball Championship in Brazil.

She is married to Dominik Klein, who plays handball for the French club HBC Nantes.

References

1984 births
Living people
German female handball players
German expatriate sportspeople in France
Expatriate handball players